Oberea nyassana is a species of beetle in the family Cerambycidae. It was described by Stephan von Breuning in 1956.

Subspecies
 Oberea nyassana nyassana Breuning, 1956
 Oberea nyassana kenyensis Breuning, 1955
 Oberea nyassana meruensis Breuning, 1978

References

nyassana
Beetles described in 1956